Whitney Houston Live: Her Greatest Performances is a posthumous live album by American recording artist Whitney Houston. It was released on November 10, 2014 by Legacy Recordings, a division of Sony Music Entertainment.

Content and release
Following the week of the album's release, Whitney Houston Live: Her Greatest Performances made Billboard chart debuts, the album sold 22,000 copies in the week ending November 16. According to Nielsen SoundScan, it entered at the top on the Top R&B Albums chart, second place on the R&B/Hip Hop chart, and number 19 on the Billboard 200. 30% of the album sales were digital, the first time Houston has achieved that.

Critical reception
Upon its release, Whitney Houston Live: Her Greatest Performances garnered enormous critical acclaim and praise. Giving it 5 stars, Jim Farber of NYDAILYNEWS, praised the album saying, 'The recordings here—with their odd echoes, imperfect playing, and wavering ambiences—show that Houston performed even better without a net than with one. The performances also work wonders in disproving the image of her, in her shiniest years, as a too-perfect wax figure of a star.' He further added, 'Only in concert did Houston, who died in 2012, show the full range of her talent. Shorn of the studio’s confining arrangements and gauzy production, the Newark native had the freedom to display those hairpin turns of phrase, last-second switches in key and playful improvisations that rank her among the greatest singers of all time.' Glenn Gamboa of Newsday gave it Grade A and wrote, 'Houston was an extraordinary singer, an artist who rarely delivered a song the same way twice. Early on, her improvised inflections, her runs, her stops and starts—they all seemed brilliantly planned and elegantly executed. "Whitney Houston Live" documents how great the singer was before her death in 2012 and builds a strong case that her talent should outlast her tabloid exploits.'

Jeff Simon of BuffaloNews, gave the album 4 stars and wrote, 'While three quarters of the female singers on TV singing contests seem to want to be Houston, what she does on this disc makes them all seem like kindergarten kids wiping their noses on their sleeves.' He further stated, 'She wasn’t long for this world. But when it came to stuff like this, find me anyone in her time that did it better. Maybe, if we’re lucky no one again will ever try.'

The Slant Magazine review noted that the song list, apart from a few obvious inclusions, was inexplicable and did little to showcase the range of Whitney Houston's live talent. Andrew Chan closes with the insight that "the myth of her perfection may make her studio work definitive, but at the height of her powers, Whitney was an artist born for the stage, where her voice could pour forth unrestrained by the limits of a booth."

Track listing

CD

DVD

Charts

Weekly charts

Year-end charts

References

External links
Whitney Houston Live: Her Greatest Performances at Amazon
Whitney Houston Live: Her Greatest Performances
Live: Her Greatest Performances at Apple Music

2014 live albums
Live albums published posthumously
Whitney Houston albums